is the fourteenth album by Japanese rock band Buck-Tick, released on April 5, 2005.

The limited edition came with a DVD of the music video for the album's only single, "Romance". It reached number four on the Oricon chart with 28,104 copies sold.

Overview
For Juusankai wa Gekkou the band deliberately adopted a Gothic theme, which is presented throughout the album. As vocalist Atsushi Sakurai is fond of the theme, he found it easy to work with and wrote the lyrics for all the songs except one. Guitarist Hisashi Imai actually thought of the idea during the tour for their previous album, but was further resolved to do it after watching Sakurai's solo performances.

The songs "Cabaret" and "Doll" have lines sung in female vocabulary and grammar, while "Doukeshi A" is from the perspective of a pierrot.

Track listing

Personnel
Buck-Tick
 Atsushi Sakurai – vocals
 Hisashi Imai – guitar, noise, electronics, chorus
 Hidehiko Hoshino – guitar, chorus
 Yutaka Higuchi – bass
 Toll Yagami – drums

Additional performers
 Kazutoshi Yokoyama – manipulator, synthesizer, piano, organ, celesta and noises

References 

2005 albums
Bertelsmann Music Group albums
Buck-Tick albums
Japanese-language albums